Council of Dvin may refer to:

 First Council of Dvin (506)
 Second Council of Dvin (554)
 Third Council of Dvin (607)
 Fourth Council of Dvin (648)